The first season of Hope & Faith originally aired in the United States on ABC. It premiered with "Pilot" on September 23, 2003, and ended with "Daytime Emmys: Part 2" on May 14, 2004 with a total of 25 episodes. The DVD was released on 31 March 2009 for the first time ever by Lionsgate Home Entertainment in a 4-disc set.

Notable guest stars in season one include: Robert Wagner, Tony Curtis, Lynda Carter, Regis Philbin, Mimi Rogers, Kathie Lee Gifford, Tom Arnold, Jenny McCarthy, Susan Lucci, Eric Braeden, and Susan Flannery.

Main cast
 Kelly Ripa as Faith Fairfield
 Faith Ford as Hope Shanowski
 Ted McGinley as Charley Shanowski
 Nicole Paggi as Sydney Shanowski
 Macey Cruthird as Hayley Shanowski
 Jansen Panettiere as Justin Shanowski (pilot)
 Paulie Litt as Justin Shanowski (from episode 2)

Guest cast
List of guest cast throughout season one:

 Daryl Edwards
 Michelle Agnew
 Heather Fairfield
 Olga Merediz
 Daniel Ziskie
 Gloria Cromwell
 Jason Olive
 Matthew Wilkas
 Val Emmich
 John Havens
 Robert Lehrer
 Marylouise Burke
 John Scurti
 Jonathan Michael Chiang
 Alina De Palma
 Ashley Marie Greiner
 Stephen G. Smith II
 Molly Cheek
 Tom Deckman
 Jesse Luke Dunn
 Saidah Arrika Ekulona
 Scott Geyer
 Trevor Heins
 Judy Kuhn
 Galadriel Masterson
 Marisa Redanty
 Cristián de la Fuente
 Ray Crisara
 Christopher Jordan
 Brett Murphy
 Regis Philbin
 Michael Bachmann
 Christopher Lee Jewett
 Tonye Patano
 Clint Black
 Nicholas Reese Art
 Greg Jackson
 Devon O'Day
 Kim Patton-Johnston
 Laksh Singh
 Robert Wagner
 Lynda Carter
 Lovette George
 Gregor Manns
 Erin Quinn Purcell
 Jim Gaffigan
 Kelly Coffield Park
 Jonathan Hadary
 Mike Arotsky
 Buzz Bovshow
 Lisa Jolley
 Linda Miller
 Michael Tenagila
 Nancy Wu
 Rendall Devaney
 Danny Woodburn
 Rebecca Budig
 Claire Alpern
 Brian Donahue
 Sascha Eiblmayr
 Lydia Jordan
 Sebastian Rand
 Derdriu Ring
 Brittany Singer
 Constance Barron
 James Murtaugh
 James Villemaire
 Delaine Yates
 Jasmine Lobe
 Nick Sullivan
 Mimi Rogers
 Matthew Lawler
 Peter Marx
 Sam Murphy
 Peter Vack
 Kathy Lee Gifford
 Fisher Stevens
 Joe Grifasi
 Ashley Burritt
 Julia Meehan
 Larry Mitchell
 Berni Padden
 Ruth Padden
 Kevin Sorbo
 Roger Clemens
 Kene Holliday
 Chuck Ardezzone
 Ben Bailey
 Willie Randolph
 Oren Stevens
 Rob Campbell
 Jason Butler Harner
 Brooke Johnson
 Patrick Garner
 Gretha Boston
 Christopher Braden Jones
 Adam Kulbersh
 Angel Sing
 Dara M. Sowell
 Charles Techman
 Erika Thomas
 Village
 Marcia Jean Kurtz
 Lisa Altomare
 Arnie Burton
 Mirjana Joković
 Vanessa A. Jones
 Lisa Masters
 Redman Maxfield
 Jay Potter
 John Pais
 Chris Gethard
 Edmund Ikeda
 Bill Parks
 Marilyn Torres
 Tom Arnold
 James H. Doerr
 Keong Sim
 Tony Curtis
 Jenny McCarthy
 Frank Biancamano
 Samrat Chakrabarti
 Dominic Chianese
 Rebecca Budig
 Cameron Mathison
 Debbi Fuhrman
 Kathleen Goldpaugh
 Dale Radunz
 Bonnie Rose
 Elizabeth Rouse
 Susan Lucci
 Eric Braeden
 Susan Flannery
 Ian Buchanan
 Kevin Cahoon
 John Callahan
 Bobbie Eakes
 Eugene Fleming
 Finola Hughes
 Eva LaRue
 Steve Lurker
 Jim Newman
 John Sloman
 Robert Verdi
 Bob Walton
 Jacob Young
 Chazz Menendez

Episodes

Award nominations
 Young Artist Award for Best Performance in a TV Series (Comedy or Drama) - Young Actress Age Ten or Younger — Macey Cruthird (2004)

Release

Critical reception
The pilot of Hope & Faith received mixed reviews. Virginia Heffernan of The New York Times praised Ripa's acting, while observing that the series were not sufficiently smart for her. Writing for PopMatters, Michael Abernethy denounced it as formulaic, and billed its humor as "dated and simplistic". Abernethy recognized that it did not reach its potential, despite recognizing that it "is all it needs to be" for the Friday night slot. Variety reviewer Phil Gallo characterised the episode as predictable, "banal and derivative" and criticized its production, as well as McGinley's room.

Home release

See also
 Hope & Faith
 List of Hope & Faith episodes

References

External links
 Hope & Faith at the Internet Movie Database

2003 American television seasons
2004 American television seasons